Copy to China (C2C or C to C) refers to when a company in China copies the business model of a successful foreign company, especially web and other IT companies. Such companies have often been very successful, out-competing the foreign company on the Chinese market. The degree of copying varies, from simply offering a directly competing service to closely mimicking the look and feel and name as pronounced in Chinese. It is a common topic of discussion how the Chinese IT industry can move beyond simple copying and localization into more innovation.

List of C2C companies 
These companies are famous examples of the Copy to China model. Many of them have evolved to more than a simple clone.

See also 
 Shanzhai
 Software industry in China
 Internet in the People's Republic of China

References 

Business models
Internet in China